Sanni Mari Elina Kurkisuo (born 26 May 1993), better known by her mononym Sanni, is a Finnish singer, songwriter and actress signed to Warner Music Finland.

Career

In 2001 she won the Napero-Finlandia prize for a writing competition. In 2012 she graduated from Sibelius-lukio arts school. The same year, she appeared in a role in the Finnish film Miss Farkku-Suomi.

She has also pursued a musical career and was in a number of bands since the age of 13. She was featured in "Pumppaa", a single by Aste. She released her first solo single "Prinsessoja ja astronautteja" in April 2013. It peaked at number three on The Official Finnish Charts. Her debut album Sotke mut was released in 2013.

On February 13, 2015, she released a new single, "2080-luvulla". Her second studio album Lelu, was released on 24 April 2015. She participated in the fourth season of the Finnish music reality show Vain elämää.

On October 7, 2016, she released her third eponymous album "SANNI".

Discography

Albums

Singles

Featured in

Other charted songs

Private life
Sanni lives together with her girlfriend, Finnish model and radio host Shirly Karvinen in Helsinki, Finland.

References

External links
 

21st-century Finnish women singers
1993 births
Living people
People from Lohja
Lesbian singers
Finnish lesbian musicians
Finnish LGBT singers
Finnish pop singers